Fréttir (English: News), is the principal nightly television news program of the Icelandic public television channel RÚV. The program has been broadcast since the channel was launched in 1966 and is the second most watched news program in Iceland.

The show airs every night at 7 o'clock. It also airs at 10 o'clock on weeknights under the moniker Tufréttir (translation: 10 o'clock news).

External links

References 

Television news shows
1966 Icelandic television series debuts
1960s Icelandic television series
1970s Icelandic television series
1980s Icelandic television series
1990s Icelandic television series
2000s Icelandic television series
2010s Icelandic television series
2020s Icelandic television series
RÚV original programming